
Unlikely Brothers: Our Story of Adventure, Loss and Redemption is co-authored by human rights activist and Co-Founder of the Enough Project, John Prendergast and his "Little Brother", Michael Mattocks.

Summary
John Prendergast, at twenty years old, decided to become a Big Brother to Michael Mattocks, a seven-year-old living in a crime-ridden neighborhood in Washington, DC. The book, co-authored by both, describes their different perspectives on their continuing relationship, shared over a period of more than 27 years.

References

External links
The Enough Project's description of the book, including trailer.
"John Prendergast On Mentoring Boys In Unlikely Brothers", Read It Forward.
"Redemption through Brotherhood", Washington Post.
"Old Bonds of Brotherhood Endure for Rights Activist Prendergast", The Philadelphia Inquirer.
"Unlikely Brothers Chronicles Forging of a Unique Bond for 2 Men", PBS NEWSHOUR.
"Newsweek/Daily Beast Writers’ Favorite Books 2011", The Daily Beast.

Reviews
whole living
Booklist
O, the Oprah Magazine
Kirkus' Reviews
Publishers Weekly

2011 non-fiction books
American autobiographies
American memoirs
Random House books
Collaborative non-fiction books